In Ireland, Christmas number ones are singles that are top of the Irish Singles Chart in the week in which Christmas Day falls.

The Irish Singles Chart was first published in 1962, and the first artist to top the chart at Christmas was Elvis Presley with "Return to Sender". The following year, Brendan Bowyer became the first Irish artist to claim top spot at Christmas with "No More". 2020 winner Dermot Kennedy ("Giants") is the first Irish national to achieve the feat since Mario Rosenstock in 2005.

The supergroup Band Aid, created by Irishman Bob Geldof, is the only act to have been number one at Christmas three times, each time with "Do They Know It's Christmas?". Four more acts have held top spot twice: The Beatles, Queen (both times with "Bohemian Rhapsody"), the Spice Girls and Eminem. Many acts that have topped the Irish Singles Chart at Christmas have also topped the UK Singles Chart at the same time.

From 2006 to 2013, every winner of the Irish Christmas number one came from the winning contestant of that year's series of the British reality contest The X Factor. Mark Ronson and Bruno Mars broke this streak in 2014 with their single "Uptown Funk". Irish bands such as The Rubberbandits ("Horse Outside" in 2010) and The Saw Doctors ("Downtown" in 2011) have contested for the honor during this time frame, but both fell well short.

List

See also
List of UK Singles Chart Christmas number ones
List of UK Singles Chart Christmas number twos

References

External links
You can check Christian songs
History of Irish Christmas No.1

Number ones
Irish
Christmas